The 2017 Magyar Kupa Final was the final match of the 2016–17 Magyar Kupa, played between Vasas SC and Ferencváros on 31 May 2017 at the Groupama Aréna in Budapest, Hungary.

On 29 May 2017, Péter Solymosi was appointed as the referee of the 2017 Magyar Kupa Final.

In the 80th minute Gergő Lovrencsics, Hungary international, suffered a horrible injury when he jumped up to head the ball against Vasas SC player Benedek Murka. Lovrencsics collapsed and lost his consciousness for a minute. He was transferred to Uzsoki utcai Kórház, located in Zugló, immediately after the accident.

Route to the final

Match

References

External links
 Official site 

2017
Ferencvárosi TC matches
Vasas SC
Association football penalty shoot-outs